Caught Short is a 1930 American pre-Code comedy film directed by Charles Reisner and written by Robert E. Hopkins, Joseph H. Johnson and Willard Mack. The film stars Marie Dressler, Polly Moran, Anita Page, Charles Morton and Thomas Conlin. The film was released on May 10, 1930, by Metro-Goldwyn-Mayer.

Cast
Marie Dressler as Marie Jones
Polly Moran as Polly Smith
Anita Page as Genevieve Jones
Charles Morton as William Smith
Thomas Conlin as Frankie
Douglas Haig as Johnny
Nanci Price as Priscilla
Greta Mann as Sophy
Herbert Prior as Mr. Frisby
T. Roy Barnes as Mr. Kidd
Edward Dillon as Mr. Thutt
Alice Moe as Miss Ambrose
Gwen Lee as Manicurist
Lee Kohlmar as Peddler
Greta Granstedt as Fanny Lee

References

External links 
 

1930 films
1930s English-language films
American comedy films
1930 comedy films
Metro-Goldwyn-Mayer films
Films directed by Charles Reisner
American black-and-white films
1930s American films
English-language comedy films